Mike Price is an American jazz trumpeter and composer from the Chicago area.

Early life and education 
Price was born in Chicago and raised in Florida and Valparaiso, Indiana. After graduating from Valparaiso High School in 1959, he studied music education at Northwestern University, continued his education in composition at the Berklee College of Music in Boston, and received a master's degree in jazz studies from the University of Southern California.

Career 
In the late-1960s, Price toured and recorded with major big bands including those of Stan Kenton and Buddy Rich. Price was also an original member of the Toshiko Akiyoshi – Lew Tabackin Big Band in Los Angeles and performed on all of the band's Grammy-nominated recordings of the 1970s and early 1980s.

In the late-1980s, Price moved to Japan, where he leads his own quintet and big band and plays in Nobuo Hara's big band, "Sharps & Flats."

Discography

As leader
Presenting Mike Price Jazz Quintet in Tokyo, Japan (2011)

With Stan Kenton
The Jazz Compositions of Dee Barton (Capitol, 1967)
Finian's Rainbow (Capitol, 1968)

References

Living people
21st-century American male musicians
21st-century trumpeters
American jazz horn players
American jazz trumpeters
American male jazz musicians
American male trumpeters
Bienen School of Music alumni
Jazz musicians from Illinois
People from Cook County, Illinois
USC Thornton School of Music alumni
People from Valparaiso, Indiana
Musicians from Indiana
Berklee College of Music alumni
University of Southern California alumni
1941 births